The 2013 Grand Prix Hassan II was a professional tennis tournament played on clay courts. It was the 29th edition of the tournament, which was part of the 2013 ATP World Tour. It took place in Casablanca, Morocco between 7 and 14 April 2013.

Singles main-draw entrants

Seeds

 1 Rankings are as of 1 April 2013.

Other entrants
The following players received wildcards into the singles main draw:
  Younès Rachidi
  Stanislas Wawrinka 
  Mehdi Ziadi

The following players received entry from the qualifying draw:
  Pablo Carreño Busta
  Marc Gicquel
  Henri Laaksonen
  Filippo Volandri

Withdrawals
Before the tournament
  Daniel Brands
  Marcel Granollers
  Marinko Matosevic
  Albert Ramos
  João Sousa
  Sergiy Stakhovsky

Doubles main-draw entrants

Seeds

 Rankings are as of 1 April 2013.

Other entrants
The following pairs received wildcards into the doubles main draw:
  Yassine Idmbarek /  Younès Rachidi
  Mohamed Saber /  Mehdi Ziadi

Champions

Singles

  Tommy Robredo def.  Kevin Anderson, 7–6(8–6), 4–6, 6–3

Doubles

  Julian Knowle /  Filip Polášek def.  Dustin Brown /  Christopher Kas, 6–3, 6–2

References

External links
 Official website